The 2010 Elf Renault Clio Cup United Kingdom with Michelin season began at Thruxton on 4 April and will finish after 20 races over 10 events at Brands Hatch on 10 October. Fifteen drivers from seven teams will take part throughout the season, mainly supporting rounds of the British Touring Car Championship but also supporting the UK round of the World Series by Renault.

Teams and drivers

Two classes have been introduced for the 2010 season:
All drivers under 23 are eligible for the Graduate Cup, with the class champion earning 25% off a registration fee for the 2011 season.
All drivers over 35 are eligible for the Masters Cup.

Calendar
The series will support the British Touring Car Championship at all rounds except Donington Park on September 19, as the Clio Cup forms part of the World Series by Renault meeting on the same date, at Silverstone. In a change for this season, Saturday races are extended to 40 minutes at most circuits, while races at Rockingham, Croft and Oulton Park are 35 minutes in length.

Standings

Drivers' Championship

Notes:
1. – James Dixon was penalised two points at Croft.
2. – Jake Packun was penalised three points at Silverstone Arena.
3. – Jeff Smith was penalised two points at Silverstone Arena.
4. – Paul Rivett was penalised two points at Brands Hatch Indy.
5. – Fulvio Mussi was penalised two points at Croft.
6. – David Dickenson was penalised two points at Thruxton.
7. – Alex Osborne was penalised four points at Silverstone Arena.

Entrants' Championship

References

External links
 Official website

Renault Clio
Renault Clio Cup UK seasons